New York’s 23rd congressional district is located in Upstate New York, and covers much of the Southern Tier. It extends along New York's border with Pennsylvania from the shores of Lake Erie in Chautauqua County to the suburbs of Binghamton in Tioga County. The district includes three of the eleven Finger Lakes: Keuka Lake, Seneca Lake, and Cayuga Lake.

The district comprises nine counties in full: Allegany, Cattaraugus, Chautauqua, Chemung, Schuyler, Seneca, Steuben, Tompkins, and Yates Counties, along with parts of Ontario and Tioga Counties. The largest cities in the predominantly rural district are Jamestown, Elmira, and Ithaca. Its largest individual employers are Corning Incorporated in Corning and Cornell University in Ithaca.

Democrat Tracy Mitrano challenged Republican incumbent Tom Reed in the November 6, 2018 election. Reed won reelection on November 6, 2018, retaining his seat for a fourth term. Reed's 8.4% margin of victory was his smallest since his first election in 2012. Reed and Mitrano also faced off in 2020, where Reed won again, this time with a margin of 16.6%.

On March 21, 2021, in light of recent sexual harassment allegations, Reed announced that he would not be seeking reelection in 2022. He resigned on May 10, 2022, leaving the seat vacant. A special election was held on August 23, which was won by Republican Joe Sempolinski. Sempolinski opted not to run for a full term in the regularly scheduled 2022 election, which was won by Nick Langworthy.

Voting

History
Various New York districts have been numbered "23" over the years, including areas in New York City and various parts of upstate New York.

1913–1919
Parts of Manhattan
1919–1969
Parts of The Bronx
1969–1971
Parts of The Bronx, Manhattan
1971–1973
Parts of The Bronx
1973–1983
Parts of The Bronx, Westchester
1983–1993 
All of Albany, Schenectady
Parts of Montgomery, Rensselaer
1993–2003 
All of Chenango, Madison, Oneida, Otsego
Parts of Broome, Delaware, Herkimer, Montgomery, Schoharie
2003–2013
All of Clinton, Franklin, Hamilton, Jefferson, Lewis, Madison, Oswego, St. Lawrence
Parts of Essex, Fulton, Oneida
2013–present
All of Allegany, Cattaraugus, Chautauqua, Chemung, Schuyler, Seneca, Steuben, Tompkins, Yates
Parts of Ontario, Tioga

List of members representing the district

1823–1833: One seat

1833–1843: Two seats
From 1833 to 1843, two seats were apportioned, elected on a general ticket.

1843–present: One seat

Recent election results
In New York, there are numerous minor parties at various points on the political spectrum. Certain parties often endorse either the Republican or Democratic candidate for every office, hence the state electoral results contain both the party votes, and the final candidate votes.

Scozzafava dropped out of the race just prior to the election and endorsed Democrat Bill Owens. The results were not certified by the New York State Board of Elections until December 15, 2009.

Historical district boundaries

See also

List of United States congressional districts
New York's congressional districts
United States congressional delegations from New York

Notes

References

Sources

External links
 Congressional Biographical Directory of the United States 1774–present
 Election results via Clerk.house.gov:
 1996 House election data, via Clerk of the House of Representatives
 1998 House election data
 2000 House election data
 2002 House election data
 2004 House election data

23
Constituencies established in 1823
1823 establishments in New York (state)